Sumner Tucker Pike (August 30, 1891 – February 21, 1976) was an American politician and government official who was a member of the U.S. Securities and Exchange Commission from 1940 to 1946 and a member of the Atomic Energy Commission (AEC) from 1946 to 1951, serving as acting chairman of the AEC during 1950.

Early life and education
Pike grew up in Lubec, Maine, a small fishing village in the northeastern portion of the state.
He was a Bowdoin College graduate, in the year 1913.

Business career
Pike entered the sardines industry and became a self-made millionaire.
He then went to Wall Street in 1928 where he became an investment banker. He retired from business in 1939.

Securities and Exchange Commission
After retiring, Pike came to Washington, D.C. and served as an advisor to the U.S. Secretary of Commerce. During World War II he was on the Securities and Exchange Commission and also was in the Office of Price Administration.

Atomic Energy Commission

Pike was chosen as one of the five original members of the Atomic Energy Commission created by the Atomic Energy Act of 1946.

The first atomic bomb test by the Soviet Union in August 1949 came earlier than expected by Americans, and over the next several months there was an intense debate within the U.S. government, military, and scientific communities regarding whether to proceed with development of the far more powerful hydrogen bomb, then known as "the Super". In November 1949, Pike joined a 3–2 majority of commissioners in recommending against proceeding with the Super. However by the time President Harry S. Truman ordered that development of the Super go on, Pike's position had drifted to being in favor of proceeding.

Another issue Pike faced on the AEC was whether to allowed nuclear testing in the United States. In March 1949, he had stated that only a national emergency could justify such testing; but following the onset of the Korean War, it was considered that such an emergency existed and nuclear bomb testing began in Nevada in 1951.

In 1950, the Joint Atomic Energy Committee of Congress voted five to four (with one Democrat joining the four Republicans on the panel) not to approve of President Harry S. Truman's nomination of Pike as chairman of the Atomic Energy Commission, when he was acting as Chairman. Instead, though Pike was renominated and approved as a member, Truman picked Gordon Dean as Chairman. When Pike resigned from the AEC in December 1951, he was the last of the original five members still on it.

Maine politician
Pike was a member of the Republican Party. 
When he returned to Maine from Washington, he resisted calls to run for Governor but did serve in the legislature.

From 1965–75, Pike was a charter member of the Roosevelt Campobello International Park Commission, which governs Roosevelt Campobello International Park, serving with Sen. Edmund S. Muskie and Franklin Delano Roosevelt Jr.

References

External links
Sumner T. Pike Papers, Truman Library

Chairmen of the United States Atomic Energy Commission
Bowdoin College alumni
Members of the U.S. Securities and Exchange Commission
1891 births
1976 deaths
People from Lubec, Maine
Maine Republicans
Franklin D. Roosevelt administration personnel
Truman administration personnel